David Christopher Justice (born April 14, 1966) is an American former professional baseball outfielder and designated hitter in Major League Baseball who played for the Atlanta Braves (1989–1996), Cleveland Indians (1997–2000), New York Yankees (2000–2001), and Oakland Athletics (2002). Justice won the National League Rookie of the Year Award in 1990, and was a three-time MLB All-Star.

Early life
Justice was raised Catholic, and attended high school at Covington Latin School, a Catholic school across the river from his hometown of Cincinnati, Ohio. He later attended Thomas More College in Crestview Hills, Kentucky, on a basketball scholarship.

Professional career

Atlanta Braves
Justice made his major league debut in May 1989, playing for the Atlanta Braves. The then 23-year-old right fielder earned the starting job after Braves fan favorite Dale Murphy was traded to the Philadelphia Phillies in August 1990. Justice promptly went on an offensive tear during the second half of the season, finishing with 28 home runs, which helped him claim the National League's Rookie of the Year Award. In 1991, the upstart Braves surged to the top of their division and Justice was leading the National League in runs batted in when he was sidelined by a nagging back injury in June. He finished with 87 runs batted in despite the injury and played in his first World Series.

After seeing his production slide slightly in 1992, Justice enjoyed a solid 1993 season. He clubbed 40 home runs and 120 runs batted in (RBIs) with 78 walks, finishing third in MVP voting behind Barry Bonds and Lenny Dykstra. Justice was batting .313 with a .427 on-base percentage and .531 slugging average when the strike ended play in 1994. When baseball returned in 1995, Justice helped his Braves to the World Series against the Cleveland Indians. He drew attention (and boos) when he criticized Atlanta fans for the level of support they were providing the team. However, Justice ended up a hero when his crucial home run in Game 6 provided the only run in a 1–0 game that clinched the championship.

In May 1996, a swing and miss in a game against the Pittsburgh Pirates caused a season-ending shoulder separation.

Cleveland Indians
Before the 1997 season, the Braves traded Justice along with outfielder Marquis Grissom to the Cleveland Indians for outfielder Kenny Lofton and relief pitcher Alan Embree. He hit .329 with a .418 OBP and .596 slugging average in 1997, with 33 home runs, while making another World Series appearance. He posted solid numbers in 1998 and 1999 with the Cleveland Indians. In 2000, he hit a combined .286 with a .377 OBP and .584 slugging average, and slugged 41 home runs with 118 RBIs.

New York Yankees
On June 28, 2000, Yankees General Manager Brian Cashman finalized a trade with Indians General Manager John Hart, sending Jake Westbrook, Zach Day, and Ricky Ledée to Cleveland in exchange for Justice. Justice won the League Championship Series Most Valuable Player Award for the 2000 American League Championship Series en route to his second world series championship. Between the Indians and Yankees, Justice hit a career-high 41 home runs in 2000. As a result of a persistent groin injury, Justice saw his production slide considerably in 2001.

Oakland Athletics
The Yankees traded Justice to the New York Mets on December 7, 2001 for third baseman Robin Ventura. Mets GM Steve Phillips then sent him to the Oakland Athletics on December 14 in exchange for pitchers Mark Guthrie and Tyler Yates. He played a final season on an Oakland team which reached the playoffs in 2002 and was named the American League Player of the Week for the first week of the season. His addition to Oakland was referred to as an 'experiment' by A's assistant GM Paul DePodesta. The experiment was to evaluate whether hitters retained their ability to get on base as they got older (kept their batter's eye). His .376 OBP and BB/K ratio of greater than 1:1 seemed to prove that correct.

Career totals
Justice finished his career with a .279 batting average, with a .378 OBP and .500 slugging percentage, 929 runs, 1,571 hits, 280 doubles, 24 triples, 305 home runs, 903 walks and 1,017 RBIs in 1,610 games. From 1991 to his last season in 2002, Justice's teams made the postseason every year (with the exception of the strike-shortened 1994 season). Of those times, he made the World Series seven times, winning twice. He is in the top ten in a number of career postseason categories, such as at-bats, games played, hits, doubles and runs scored.

Honors
On May 9, 1994, Justice was listed in People'''s "50 Most Beautiful People" issue (Vol. 41 No. 17). The article goes on to state: "'I check my face to make sure there's nothing sticking on it,' he says. 'But I don't make sure every hair's in place.' He needn't worry. He gets the most fan mail on the team and is mobbed when he makes personal appearances on behalf of charities."

In March 2007, it was announced that Justice would be inducted into the Atlanta Braves Hall of Fame. He was the first member of any of the Braves' 14 consecutive division title teams (1991–2005, excluding the strike-shortened season in 1994) to be inducted in the Braves Hall of Fame. The induction took place on August 17, 2007. Numerous ex-Braves players and coaches were in attendance and tribute videos from Braves legend Hank Aaron and former owner Ted Turner were shown. Prior to that evening's game Justice was presented with a portrait by sports artist Bart Forbes during an on-field ceremony. Justice was eligible for the Major League Baseball Hall of Fame in 2008, but he received only one vote, preventing him from being named on future ballots. The timing of the vote may have adversely affected his candidacy, as it was held shortly after the release of the Mitchell Report.

Mitchell Report
In an interview for the Mitchell Report, released December 13, 2007, Justice denied using performance-enhancing substances, but was willing to report the names of individuals he suspected, though he claimed to have no direct knowledge of any other player's steroid use. He also claims to have never been warned of the side effects of steroids or explicitly told steroids were a banned substance. The Mitchell Report states that in a later interview, former New York Mets clubhouse attendant Kirk Radomski claimed to have sold Justice human growth hormone when Justice was with the Yankees after the 2000 World Series. Justice has called the allegation "a bald-faced lie" and says that he has never met Radomski.

Justice has claimed that his only involvement with performance-enhancing drugs was a discussion about HGH in 2000 with Brian McNamee, then the New York Yankees' strength coach. Justice, who had shoulder problems, thought that HGH might aid in his recovery. Justice stated that after the discussion, he went to his locker and found a bag containing HGH and several injection needles; Justice claimed that he was unwilling to inject himself and never used any of it. Justice further stated in the interviews that all claims in the Mitchell Report concerning his alleged purchase and use of any performance-enhancing drugs were false and encouraged all players whose names appear in the report, especially Roger Clemens, to publicly deny any claims made by the Mitchell Report if they are untrue.

Broadcasting career
After his playing career, Justice served as a commentator for ESPN baseball telecasts for two years. He later joined the YES Network of the New York Yankees as a game and studio analyst, and also hosted the network's youth-oriented program Yankees on Deck. Prior to the 2008 season, the YES Network announced that Justice would not appear on air during that season, but would contribute articles to the network's website. Justice stated that this change was not in response to his inclusion in the Mitchell report, but was due to the destruction of his San Diego County home in the 2007 California wildfires and the recent passing of his mother.  Justice never returned to the network.

Justice has also appeared on a 1992 episode of The Young and the Restless. He was played by Stephen Bishop in Moneyball, the film adaptation of the best-selling Michael Lewis book Moneyball: The Art of Winning an Unfair Game about the Oakland Athletics baseball team and its general manager, Billy Beane.

Personal life

On New Year's Day 1993, Justice married film actress Halle Berry. The couple resided in Sandy Springs, Georgia. They separated on February 22, 1996, and divorced on June 20, 1997. The marriage ended acrimoniously, with Berry seeking a restraining order against Justice. He married Rebecca Villalobos on February 8, 2001. Villalobos is CEO of Exotic Spices Calendars. They have three children: David Jr., Dionisio, and Raquel. In 2014, the family were on an episode of Celebrity Wife Swap'', inspiring Raquel to pursue acting.

See also

 List of Major League Baseball career home run leaders
 List of Major League Baseball career runs batted in leaders
 List of Major League Baseball players named in the Mitchell Report

References

External links

David Justice at Pelota Binaria (Venezuelan Professional Baseball League)

1966 births
Living people
African-American baseball players
American League Championship Series MVPs
Atlanta Braves players
Baseball players from Cincinnati
Cardenales de Lara players
American expatriate baseball players in Venezuela
Cleveland Indians players
Durham Bulls players
Greenville Braves players
Macon Braves players
Major League Baseball broadcasters
Major League Baseball right fielders
Major League Baseball Rookie of the Year Award winners
National League All-Stars
New York Yankees announcers
New York Yankees players
Norwich Navigators players
Oakland Athletics players
People from Sandy Springs, Georgia
Pulaski Braves players
Richmond Braves players
Silver Slugger Award winners
Sumter Braves players
Thomas More Saints baseball players
YES Network
African-American Catholics
21st-century African-American people
20th-century African-American sportspeople